Dwight Townsend (September 26, 1826 – October 29, 1899) was a U.S. Representative from New York.

Biography
Born in New York City, Townsend was educated at Columbia Grammar & Preparatory School. He worked in the sugar refining business, and was active in other ventures including the Equitable Life Assurance Society and the Bankers' and Merchants' Telegraph Company.

Townsend was elected as a Democrat to the Thirty-eighth Congress to fill the vacancy caused by the resignation of Henry G. Stebbins and served from December 5, 1864, to March 3, 1865. During this term, Townsend voted "nay" (the minority position) on the question of adopting the Thirteenth Amendment to the United States Constitution.

Townsend was elected to the Forty-second Congress (March 4, 1871 – March 3, 1873). He did not run for reelection, and resumed his former business pursuits.

Death and burial
He died in New York City on October 29, 1899. He was interred at Green-Wood Cemetery in Brooklyn, New York.

References

External links

Dwight Townsend at Political Graveyard

1826 births
1899 deaths
19th-century American businesspeople
Burials at Green-Wood Cemetery
Democratic Party members of the United States House of Representatives from New York (state)
19th-century American politicians
Columbia Grammar & Preparatory School alumni